Grammatophyllum rumphianum is an epiphytic species of orchid.

Distribution
 Borneo, the Moluccas and the Philippines.

References

rumphianum